Utica High School, known locally as UHS, is one of four public high schools in the Utica Community School District, located in the metro Detroit region.

History
The forerunner of Utica High School, the Utica Union School, opened in 1860. It was renamed Utica High School in 1900. The school was originally located within its namesake city of Utica, Michigan until 1955, when the construction of the current building was completed in Shelby Township. The former location is now home to Eppler Jr. High School.

Utica High School was the district's original high school. It served as the sole high school until Henry Ford II, Stevenson, and Eisenhower High Schools opened in the late '60s and '70s.

Demographics
As of the 2020-2021 school year, the school had a total enrollment of 1,404. Of that, 84.3% were white, 4.7% were African American, 4.1% were Asian, 4.3% were Hispanic, 2.3% were multi-racial, 0.2% were native Hawaiian/Pacific Islander, and 0.1% were Native American.

The gender distribution was evenly distributed between those male and female.

Approximately 36% of the student body was considered economically disadvantaged, with 31% eligible to participate in the Free Lunch Program under the National School Lunch Act.

Athletics
Utica competes in the Macomb Area Conference. The football team plays their home games at Swinehart Field, which they share with crosstown rival Eisenhower.

The school participates in a number of sports, including:
Football
Basketball
Track & Field
Cross Country Running
Soccer
Tennis
Competitive Cheerleading
Baseball / Softball
Volleyball
Bowling
Ice Hockey - unified team of players from Utica and Ford II

In the 2019-2020 school year, All-Academic Athletes made up over 80% of all athletes.

Notable alumni
Norm Augustinus - Writer, comedian, actor 
Steve Stonebreaker - Former National Football League linebacker
Duke Maas - former Major League Baseball player for the Detroit Tigers, Kansas City Athletics and New York Yankees
Joe Cada - Winner of the 2009 World Series of Poker Main Event

References

External links

Public high schools in Michigan
Educational institutions established in 1876
Schools in Macomb County, Michigan